Old Shorter Hill is a summit in Rome, Georgia. It is considered to be one of the Seven Hills of Rome, Georgia.

The hill was originally known as Shelton Hill, named after the main landowner in the area. The Cherokee Baptist Female College was originally housed in facilities located on the hill when it was founded in 1873. In 1877, Cherokee Baptist Female College was renamed Shorter College, thanks to generous donations from Alfred and Martha Shorter. In 1910, the college moved from Shelton Hill to its current location outside of downtown Rome. The hill's name was changed to Old Shorter Hill upon the death of Martha Shorter. There is currently a cul-de-sac on the summit.

References

Mountains of Floyd County, Georgia
Mountains of Georgia (U.S. state)
Rome, Georgia